Golconda is an oil painting on canvas by Belgian surrealist René Magritte, painted in 1953. It is usually housed at the Menil Collection in Houston, Texas.

The piece depicts a scene of "raining men", nearly identical to each other dressed in dark overcoats and bowler hats, who seem to be either falling down like rain drops, floating up like helium balloons, or just stationed in mid-air as no movement or motion is implied. The backdrop features red-roofed buildings and a mostly blue partly cloudy sky, lending credence to the theory that the men are not raining. The men are equally spaced in a lattice, facing the viewpoint and receding back in rhombic grid layers.

Magritte lived in a similar suburban environment, and dressed in a similar fashion. The bowler hat was a common feature of much of his work, and appears in paintings such as The Son of Man.

Charly Herscovici, who was bequeathed copyright on the artist's works, commented on Golconda:

One interpretation is that Magritte is demonstrating the line between individuality and group association, and how it is blurred. All of these men are dressed the same, have the same bodily features and are all floating/falling. This leaves one to look at the men as a group. Whereas if one looks at each person, one can predict that they may be completely different from another figure.

As was often the case with Magritte's works, the title Golconda was found by his poet friend Louis Scutenaire. Golkonda is a ruined city in the state of Telangana, India, near Hyderabad, which from the mid-14th century until the end of the 17th was the capital of two successive kingdoms; the fame it acquired through being the center of the region's legendary diamond industry was such that its name remains, according to the Oxford English Dictionary, "a synonym for 'mine of wealth'."

Magritte included a likeness of Scutenaire in the painting – his face is used for the large man by the chimney of the house on the right of the picture.

See also
 It's Raining Men

References

External links
Interview with Charly Herscovici
In Rushdie's book, Two Years Eight Months and Twenty-Eight Nights: "In the Menil Collection gallery in Houston, Texas, a shrewd curator named Christof Pantikrator suddenly understood for the first time the prophetic nature of Rene Magritte's masterwork, Golconda, ... ."  Page 161–162.
The painting also appears on the cover of Randy Katz and Gaetano Borriello's textbook Contemporary Logic Design 2nd Edition.

Paintings by René Magritte
Rain in art
Surrealist paintings
1953 paintings